1st Round is an album by Italian musician and producer Pino Presti, released in 1976 under Atlantic Records. It's considered one of the most innovative albums of the 70's in the  Italian music scene. All songs are composed by Pino Presti, except for "Smile" (Charlie Chaplin), "Sunny" (Bobby Hebb) and "Firefly" (Kenny Nolan).

Track listing

Credits

Musicians

 Pino Presti: electric bass, Fender Rhodes, arranger, conductor, vocal in "Angie"
 Andrea Sacchi: acoustic & electric guitar
 Massimo Luca:  acoustic & electric guitar
 Claudio Bazzari: acoustic & electric guitar 
 Alberto Radius: synth guitar
 Ellade Bandini: drums
 George Aghedo: conga, percussions, rap vocals in "Aghedo Asanwony"
 Renè Mantegna: conga, percussions
 Alberto Baldan Bembo: Moog, marimba
 Alberto Mompellio: Hammond organ, Eminent, piano
 Giorgio Baiocco: tenor saxophone, flute
 Bruno De Filippi: harmonica in "Sunny" 
 Riccardo Zappa: acoustic guitar in "C'era Una Volta"
 La Bionda: vocals in "Firefly"
 Attilio Donadio: alto saxophone solo in "Smile"
 Fermo Lini: trumpet
 Giuliano Bernicchi: trumpet 
 Gianni Caranti: trombone
 Sergio Almangano: 1st violin
 Arturo Prestipino Giarritta: 1st violin
 Ronnie Jones: lead vocals & lyricist in "Funky Bump"

More credits 
 Recorded at Regson Studio (Milan)
 Sound engineer: Gianluigi Pezzera / Paolo Bocchi
 Artwork: Mario Convertino
 Photograph: Karin Hemp

References

External links 
 Pino Presti - 1st Round
 Music Brainz
 Discogs - 1st Round
 Opac SBN - 1. round / Orchestra di Pino Presti

1976 albums
Pino Presti albums
Albums arranged by Pino Presti
Albums conducted by Pino Presti
Albums produced by Pino Presti